Rubaba Khalil qizi Muradova, born Rubaba Ishragi  (21 March 1930 – 28 August 1983), was an Iranian and Azerbaijani opera (mezzo-soprano) and folk singer. She graduated from the Zeynalli College of Music in Baku and worked at the Azerbaijan State Opera and Ballet Theatre, where she started in 1954. In 1971, Rubaba Muradova became the People's Artist of Azerbaijan.

Early life
Rubaba Muradova was born to a family of cleric in the Iranian city of Ardabil. In 1943, she moved to the Soviet Azerbaijan, and settled in the city of Ali Bayramli. Since age 17, she acted in various roles at the local theaters.

Career 
In 1950, a troupe from Baku was touring the region. During the tour, an actress for one of the main roles got sick, and the head trouper agreed to replace her with Rubaba Muradova for one night. Despite poor performance (according to Muradova herself), she was successful mostly due to her vocal improvisation of the role. She then was invited to move to Baku to pursue a degree in professional singing.

In 1953, she graduated from the Zeynalli College of Music in Baku, where she was taught by prominent khananda Seyid Shushinski. She started working at the Azerbaijan State Opera and Ballet Theatre in 1954. Her most famous role was that of Leyli in Uzeyir Hajibeyov's Leyli and Majnun (1908). Muradova's melodic improvisations are remembered for their emotional qualities that often bring the audience to tears. Her colleagues explained this emotional singing by the difficulties Muradova experienced in her personal life, particularly her being homesick for Ardabil and not being able to visit it because of the closed Soviet-Iranian border.

Awards
In 1971, Rubaba Muradova became the People's Artists of the Azerbaijan SSR.

References

1930 births
1983 deaths
20th-century Azerbaijani women singers
Iranian opera singers
People from Ardabil
People's Artists of the Azerbaijan SSR
Iranian emigrants to the Soviet Union
Soviet Azerbaijani people
Mugham singers
Iranian Azerbaijanis